Stefano Nepa (born 21 November 2001) is an Italian Grand Prix motorcycle racer, currently competing in the 2023 Moto3 World Championship for the Angeluss MTA Team.

Career
In his native Italy, Nepa won the CIV PreMoto3 250cc 4-stroke championship in 2014 and competed in the CIV Moto3 championship from 2016 to 2018.

Moto3 World Championship
He moved onto FIM CEV Moto3 Junior World Championship in 2018 while also making a wild-card appearance at Mugello which marked his Grand Prix debut. In the same year, he became a full-time Grand Prix rider when he replaced Makar Yurchenko in the CIP - Green Power team before the Dutch TT. He scored his first championship points at the season finale in Valencia.

In 2019, after starting the season in the FIM CEV Moto3 Junior World Championship and appearing as a wild-card at the Spanish Grand Prix, he replaced Vicente Pérez from the Dutch TT onwards, achieving a best finish of 8th in Thailand. For the 2020 Moto3 season he was signed by Aspar Team as a full-time rider.

Angeluss MTA Team (2022-present)
From 2021 season, Nepa competed for the Angeluss MTA Team.

Career statistics

Grand Prix motorcycle racing

By season

By class

Races by year
(key) (Races in bold indicate pole position; races in italics indicate fastest lap)

References

External links

 

2001 births
Living people
Italian motorcycle racers
Moto3 World Championship riders
Sportspeople from the Province of Teramo
People from Giulianova